Riverfront Festival Plaza is a park located in downtown Windsor, Ontario, in Canada.  It is located along the banks of the Detroit River, between the river and Casino Windsor.

It has hosted many events including Festival Epicure, Bluesfest International Windsor, Beaverfest, Windsor Pride and Windsor Ribfest.

In 2011, the city began renovations to feature a $3.6 million stage complex festival size facilities and improved grounds.

External links
 

Parks in Windsor, Ontario
Festival venues in Canada